2009 in Korea may refer to:
2009 in North Korea
2009 in South Korea